Eriocrania komaii is a moth of the family Eriocraniidae. It is endemic to Japan (Honshu).

The larvae probably feed on the leaves of Sorbus japonlca.

References

komaii
Endemic fauna of Japan
Leaf miners
Moths described in 2006
Moths of Japan